The Church of the Holy Emperor Uroš is a Serbian Orthodox church located in the center of Ferizaj (also known by the Serbian population as Uroševac) in Kosovo. It belongs to the Eparchy of Raška and Prizren.

The church was built between 1929 and 1933, dedicated to Serbian emperor Uroš V (r. 1355–71). Its architect was Josif Mihajlović Jurukovski from Skopje. It was built as a five-domed building with a trefoil base, and made of concrete, stone and brick mix which was later plastered. The church of the Gračanica monastery served as a model for the diverse composition of the upper part of the temple. The decoration in the dome consists of chess box with crosses, floral motifs and bricks. The main dome rests on four free pillars.

The murals were painted by Janko Kuzmanović from Galičnik, from 1932–36, who, along with Viktorija Puzanova from Mitrovica, created the throne icons and richly carved iconostasis decorations. The collection of Serbian medieval iconography, including the icon of the Holy Trinity, painted by Josif Radević from Lazaropolje in 1896. The iconostasis is from the 19th century, made in wood, and it was a gift of the Serbian King Aleksandar I Karađorđević.

The church was looted and set on fire by Albanians after the arrival of the US KFOR forces in town, at the end of June 1999. It was attacked in the 2004 unrest, and Albanian nationalist graffiti were painted on the walls in 2013.

In 2015 work on the exterior began. In September 2016, more than 200 Serb former inhabitants of the town (pre-war 12,000 Serbs, now only three), participated in liturgy in the church.

See also 
 Destroyed Serbian heritage in Kosovo

Annotations

References

Sources

External links 
 
 
 The list of destroyed and desecrated churches in Kosovo and Metohija June-October 1999 (Списак уништених и оскрнављених цркава на Косову и Метохији јун-октобар 1999)

Churches completed in 1933
Serbian Orthodox church buildings in Kosovo
Destroyed churches in Kosovo
Persecution of Serbs
Religious organizations established in the 1930s
Attacks on churches in Europe
20th-century Serbian Orthodox church buildings
1933 establishments in Europe
Buildings and structures in Ferizaj
Cultural heritage monuments in Ferizaj District
Protected Monuments of Culture